Tang Yan (born 6 December 1983), also known as Tiffany Tang, is a Chinese actress and singer. She graduated from the Central Academy of Drama in 2006. In 2007, she was nominated for the Best Actress award at the Shanghai Television Festival for her film debut in Farewell for Love. She left her company Orange Sky Entertainment Group mid-2012 to set up her own studio.

Tang is noted for her roles in hit dramas Chinese Paladin 3 (2009), My Daughter (2011), My Sunshine (2015), and The Princess Weiyoung (2016).

Career

Beginnings
In 2001, Tang took part in the 3rd "Shulei Century Star" competition, and won the champion award. In 2004, Tang was selected as one of the 14 "Olympic Babies" by director Zhang Yimou and performed at the closing ceremony of the Athens 2004 Summer Olympics.

In 2007, Tang made her official acting debut in the historical television series  Carol of Zhenguan. The same year, she starred in the romance film Farewell For Love. She received positive reviews for her performance and was nominated as Best Actress at the Shanghai Film Festival and as Best New Actress at the Beijing College Student Film Festival.

2009–2014: Rising popularity
In 2009, Tang rose to fame after starring in fantasy action drama Chinese Paladin 3, adapted from the video game of the same title. Tang's portrayal of Zi Xuan and her chemistry with Wallace Huo drew positive reviews from the audience. The same year, she played the role of Chu Chu in the wuxia fantasy film The Storm Warriors.

In 2010, Tang co-starred alongside Jay Chou in the Taiwanese science fiction television series Pandamen and sung the theme song of the drama "Love Attraction", composed specially for her character.

In 2011, Tang played the role of kind and innocent Xia Tianmei in the metropolitan romance drama My Daughter, which topped television ratings during its time slot and became the highest rated drama broadcast by Anhui TV that year. The same year, she starred in the romance comedy drama Waking Love Up alongside Roy Qiu , which also became one of the highest rated dramas of the year. Tang saw a further rise in popularity, and won several popularity awards at local award ceremonies.

In 2012, Tang co-starred in fantasy action drama Xuan-Yuan Sword: Scar of Sky, adapted from the popular role-playing game Xuan-Yuan Sword as the demoness Nugu Ningke. The drama topped TV ratings and garnered 2 billion views online, becoming the 9th drama in Hunan TV's broadcast history to achieve that feat. The same year she starred in the period romance war drama A Beauty in Troubled Times.

In 2013, Tang starred in the action romance drama Agent X, portraying an elite secret agent. She was nominated for the Best Actress award at the Huading Awards for her performance, and was named Most Commercially Valuable Actress of the year at the China TV Drama Awards.

In 2014, Tang reunited with Chinese Paladin 3 co-star Wallace Huo in Perfect Couple, a historical romantic comedy written by Tong Hua. The drama topped online views and became a hot topic, winning Tang and Huo the Best Couple award at the China TV Drama Awards and Tang the Most Popular Actress award at the China Student Television Festival. The same year, she starred in the romance film For Love or Money as a flight attendant, and won the Best Supporting Actress award for her performance.

2015–present: Breakthrough and mainstream success

In 2015, Tang achieved breakthrough with starring roles in a series of hit dramas. In January, she starred in modern romance drama My Sunshine alongside Wallace Chung, based on the novel He Yi Sheng Xiao Mo by Gu Man. It was a major success, topping television ratings in its time slot and gained 10 million views online. She also starred in the period romance drama Lady & Liar alongside Hawick Lau, where she portrayed an acrobatics artist who transforms into a wealthy young mistress. Lady & Liar became the second highest rated drama for Jiangsu TV that year and broke 4 billion views online. In February, Tang starred alongside Li Yifeng in another period romance drama Legend of Fragrance as a perfumer. The drama was the highest rated drama for Hunan TV that year and broke the record for the highest ratings achieved in the first day of premiere. In June, Tang played the female lead A'ning in the popular tomb-raiding web drama The Lost Tomb, based on the novel Daomu Biji. The Lost Tomb is the most watched web drama of 2015 with over 2.8 billion views. In July, she starred in modern romance drama Diamond Lover with Rain, playing a jewelry designer. The drama was a commercial success with a peak rating of 1.249 and more than 3.3 billion views online Due to the success of her dramas, Tang was given the title of "1 billion queen" as all of her dramas have reached 1 billion views or more. She was nominated at the 17th Huading Awards for Best Actress in four different categories, and won Best Actress in the contemporary genre for her performance in My Sunshine. She also became the promotional ambassador for the 7th China TV Drama Awards, where she won the awards for Actress with the Most Media Influence as well as Audience's Favorite Character. That year, Tang was ranked 20th on Forbes China Celebrity with an income revenue of 45 million yuan. Tang was crowned "Golden Eagle Goddess" for the 11th China Golden Eagle TV Art Festival due to her successful streak in television. Despite her success, Tang received criticism from repetitively playing the same kind of roles without any breakthrough.

In 2016, Tang starred in Korean-Chinese action film Bounty Hunters alongside Korean actor Lee Min-ho and Wallace Chung. The film broke 1 million admissions, and Tang received praise for her acting breakthrough as a femme fatale. She then starred in fantasy romance film A Chinese Odyssey Part Three directed by Jeffery Lau, playing the role of Zixia Fairy. The film was released on the mid-autumn festival and topped box office charts. Tang made her small-screen comeback in the historical drama The Princess Weiyoung, playing the titular role of Li Weiyoung. The drama was a huge success, topping both television and web ratings with over 2% and in its final episodes and garnering 18 billion views online; and also became one of the highest rated television dramas of 2016. Tang won the Best Actress award at the Huading Awards for her performance.

In 2017, Tang starred alongside Nicholas Tse and Jung Yong-hwa in the comedy film Cook Up a Storm.

In 2018, Tang starred in the youth inspirational drama The Way We Were. She also starred in the action thriller film Europe Raiders. On 12 June, Tang had her wax figure displayed at Madam Tussauds Shanghai.

In 2019, Tang starred in the romance drama See You Again alongside Shawn Dou. She reunited with Shawn Dou in the historical drama The Legend of Xiao Chuo, portraying the title character Xiao Yanyan.

Personal life
Tang and actor Luo Jin revealed their relationship to the public on 6 December 2016, on her 33rd birthday. they were married in Vienna, Austria on 28 October 2018. In September 2019, they announced that they were expecting their first child together. In December 2019 she had given birth to a baby girl.

In March 2021, Tang voiced her support for cotton produced in Xinjiang by reposting a post on Weibo that was shared 40 million times, a move replicated by most Chinese celebrities, after some international companies announced they will not purchase cotton from the region due to concerns over possible forced labor of Uyghurs.

Filmography

Film

Television series

Music video

Discography

Albums

Singles

Awards and nominations

Forbes China Celebrity 100

References

External links
Tiffany Tang's social media
  Tiffany Tang's weibo
  Tiffany Tang's Xiaohongshu

1983 births
Living people
21st-century Chinese actresses
Actresses from Shanghai
Central Academy of Drama alumni
Chinese broadcasters
Chinese women singer-songwriters
Chinese film actresses
Chinese Mandopop singers
Chinese television actresses
Chinese television presenters
Chinese television producers
Chinese women television presenters
Singers from Shanghai
VJs (media personalities)
Women television producers